Urine therapy or urotherapy, (also urinotherapy, Shivambu,  uropathy, or auto-urine therapy) in alternative medicine is the application of human urine for medicinal or cosmetic purposes, including drinking of one's own urine and massaging one's skin, or gums, with one's own urine. No scientific evidence exists to support any beneficial health claims of urine therapy.

History
Though urine has been believed useful for diagnostic and therapeutic purposes in several traditional systems, and mentioned in some medical texts, auto-urine therapy as a system of alternative medicine was popularized by British naturopath John W. Armstrong in the early 20th century. Armstrong was inspired by his family's practice of using urine to treat minor stings and toothaches, by a metaphorical reading of the Biblical Proverb 5:15 "Drink waters out of thine own cistern, and running waters out of thine own well", and his own experience with ill-health that he treated with a 45-day fast "on nothing but urine and tap water". Starting in 1918, Armstrong prescribed urine-therapy regimens that he devised to many thousands of patients, and in 1944 he published The Water of Life: A treatise on urine therapy, which became a founding document of the field.

These works often reference Shivambu Kalpa, a treatise on the pharmaceutical value of urine, as a source of the practice in the East. They also cite passing references to properties and uses of urine in Yogic-texts such as Vayavaharasutra by Bhadrabahu and Hatha Yoga Pradapika by Svatmarama; and Ayurvedic texts such as Sushruta Samhita, Bhava Prakasha and Harit.

Urine-therapy has also been combined with other forms of alternative medicine. It was used by ancient Roman dentists to whiten teeth.

Modern claims and findings
An exhaustive description of the composition of human urine was prepared for NASA in 1971. Urine is an aqueous solution of greater than 95% water. The remaining constituents are, in order of decreasing concentration: urea 9.3 g/L, chloride 1.87 g/L, sodium 1.17 g/L, potassium 0.750 g/L, creatinine 0.670 g/L and other dissolved ions, inorganic and organic compounds.

In China there is a Urine Therapy Association which claims thousand of members.

According to a BBC report, a Thai doctor promoting urine therapy said that Thai people had been practicing urophagia for a long time, but according to the Department of Thai Traditional and Alternative Medicine, there was no record of the practice.

Urinating on jellyfish, wasp or bee stings, sunburns, cuts, and blood vessel bursts is a common "folk remedy", however Scientific American reports that it may be counterproductive, as it can activate nematocysts remaining at the site of the sting, making the pain worse.

Urine and urea have been claimed by some practitioners to have an anti-cancer effect, and urotherapy has been offered along with other forms of alternative therapy in some cancer clinics in Mexico.

In the Arabian Peninsula, bottled camel urine is sold by vendors, as prophetic medicine with its claimed urine therapy, health benefits. Saudi police arrested a man, "because the urine in the bottles was his own".

In January 2022, Christopher Key, a spreader of COVID-19 misinformation, claimed that urine therapy is the antidote to the COVID-19 pandemic. Key also falsely claims that a 9-month research trial on urine therapy has been conducted. There is no scientific evidence supporting urine therapy as a cure to the COVID-19 disease.

Health concerns
There is no scientific evidence of a therapeutic use for untreated urine.

According to the American Cancer Society, "available scientific evidence does not support claims that urine or urea given in any form is helpful for cancer patients".

In 2016 the Chinese Urine therapy Association was included on a list of illegal organizations by the Ministry of Civil Affairs.  However, the Municipal Bureau of Civil Affairs in Wuhan, said they had no jurisdiction over the association.

See also
 Conjugated estrogens, a hormone therapy medication manufactured by purification from horse urine
 Fecal microbiota transplant
 List of topics characterized as pseudoscience
 List of unproven and disproven cancer treatments
 Panchgavya, one of several uses of cow urine in Ayurveda
 Urinalysis, tests performed on urine for diagnostic purposes
 Virgin boy egg, a traditional dish of Dongyang, Zhejiang, China in which eggs are boiled in the urine of young boys
 Bear Grylls

Notes

References

Further reading
 "Urine therapy", Martin Gardner, Skeptical Inquirer, May–June 1999.

Alternative medical treatments
Biologically-based therapies
Naturopathy
Pseudoscience
Urine